The Russian undesirable organizations law (officially Federal Law of 23.05.2015 N 129-FZ "On amendments of some legislative acts of the Russian Federation") is a law that was signed by President Vladimir Putin on 23 May 2015 as a follow-up to the 2012 Russian foreign agent law and Dima Yakovlev Law. The law gives prosecutors the power to extrajudicially declare foreign and international organizations "undesirable" in Russia and shut them down. Organizations that do not disband when given notice to do so, as well as Russians who maintain ties to them, are subject to high fines and significant jail time. Critics say the terms are unclear and lead to dangerous precedent. Supporters of the bill reference organizations that have become actively involved in supporting political dissent.

Implications for NGOs
Under the law, Russian prosecutors are able to target foreign groups which they deem to present "a threat to the foundation of the constitutional order of the Russian Federation, the defense capability of the country or the security of the state."

Groups designated undesirable are forbidden from holding public events and from possessing or distributing promotional materials, including via mass media. All Russian banks and financial institutions are forbidden from cooperating with such organizations and are required to inform Russia's financial watchdog agency about any such organizations that attempt to contact them.

Given a notice from the prosecutors, such organizations have to disband. Violators face fines or prison terms of up to six years. People cooperating with such entities are subject to fines and can be banned from entering Russia. Russians who maintain ties with "undesirables" face penalties ranging from fines to a maximum of six years in prison.

Duma deputy Aleksandr Tarnavsky, one of the legislation's coauthors, stated that "I do not think that there is a particular company that has to fall under this list. But if a company suddenly starts causing a lot of trouble, starts acting arrogantly and impudently, then in theory it could fall under the list of undesirable organizations."

Enforcement
On 25 May 2015, a first proposal of undesirable NGOs to the General Prosecutor's office was made by a parliamentarian from LDPR. The list included the think tank Carnegie Moscow Center, the international history and human rights society Memorial, as well as the Moscow offices of Human Rights Watch and Amnesty International.

On 7 July 2015, RIA Novosti published an alleged shortlist by the Federal Council of Russia of organizations to be branded undesirable. Those include the US-based Open Society Institute, the National Endowment for Democracy, the MacArthur Foundation and the Charles Stewart Mott Foundation. The list also includes the Polish-based Education for Democracy foundation and the East European Democratic Centre as well as three Ukrainian organizations: The Ukrainian World Congress, the Ukrainian World Coordinating Council and the Crimean Field Mission on Human Rights.

After the Federal Council's vote to include it on the recommended list of "undesirable organizations", the MacArthur Foundation announced the closing of its Russian division, operating since 1992.

In July 2015, the National Endowment for Democracy became the first organization to be officially blacklisted by the Russian authorities under the law. The decision by the Office of the Prosecutor General of the Russian Federation was announced on its website in which it claimed that NED's activities "pose a threat to constitutional order of the Russian Federation, defense potential and security of the state". Among NED's alleged infractions were its donations to commercial and non-profit organizations that independently monitor elections, as well as for undefined "political activities" and "discrediting service in the [Russian] armed forces".

In November 2015, two branches of George Soros' charity network, the Open Society Foundations and the Open Society Institute Assistance Foundation, were banned under the law in Russia. The infractions were not listed, but the Office of the Prosecutor General of the Russian Federation released a statement stating that "the activity of the Open Society Foundations and the Open Society Institute Assistance Foundation represents a threat to the foundations of the constitutional system of the Russian Federation and the security of the state".

Ahead of the March 2018 presidential election, two European organizations involved in election monitoring were added.

Targeted NGOs

The registry of "undesirable organizations" includes the following organizations:

 Institute of Modern Russia (United States) (April 2017); 
 International Republican Institute (16 August 2016);
 Media Development Investment Fund (16 August 2016).
 National Democratic Institute for International Affairs (May 17, 2016).
 National Endowment for Democracy (July 27, 2015); 
 OSI Assistance Foundation and Open Society Foundations (December 1, 2015); 
 U.S. Russia Foundation for Economic Advancement and the Rule of Law (December 7, 2015);
 Coalition to Investigate the Persecution of Falun Gong (July 17, 2020)
 Dragon Springs 
 Global Mission to Rescue Persecute Falun Gong Practitioners Inc.
 Friends of Falun Gong Inc.
 Doctors Against Forced Organ Harvesting 
 The European Falun Dafa Association
 Association of Schools of Political Studies of the Council of Europe (December 17, 2020)

 Atlantic Council (25 July 2019)
 Člověk v tísni (13 November 2019)
 European Platform for Democratic Elections (EPDE) (13 March 2018);
 International Elections Study Center (IESC) (13 March 2018)
 Open Russia (United Kingdom) (April 2017);
 German Marshall Fund (USA) (March 2018)
 Deutsch-Russischer Austausch (Germany) (May 2021)
 Bard College (USA) (June 2021)
 Oxford Russian Fund (UK) (June 2021)
 Chatham House (April 7, 2022)
 Heinrich Böll Foundation (Germany) (May 2022)
 Macdonald–Laurier Institute (Canada) (August 2022)
 Ukrainian Canadian Congress (Canada) (August 2022)
 Ukrainian National Federation of Canada (Canada) (August 2022)
 Transparency International (March 2023)

 Meduza, news website, headquartered in Riga (Latvia) (January 2023)

Reactions
Russia's human rights ombudsman Ella Pamfilova said the power given to the Prosecutor General to tag groups "undesirable" without going to court contradicts the Russian constitution and condemned the lack of a right to appeal.

German Chancellor Angela Merkel's spokesman said that the law was an attempt to further isolate and discredit members of civil society who were critical of the government.

Britain's Minister for Europe, David Lidington, said it was "yet another example of the Russian authorities' harassment of NGOs and those who work with them in Russia".

The US State Department stated it was "deeply troubled" by the law and expressed concern that it "will further restrict the work of civil society in Russia and is a further example of the Russian government's growing crackdown on independent voices and intentional steps to isolate the Russian people from the world". The Deputy Chief of the US Mission to the OSCE Permanent Council urged the Russian government "to uphold its international obligations and OSCE commitments to respect the freedoms of expression, peaceful assembly and association, and the rule of law."

Amnesty International said the bill would "squeeze the life" from civil society, while Human Rights Watch warned it would be locals who would be worst-hit. Veteran human rights activist Lyudmila Alexeyeva described the law as "another step toward lowering the curtain between our country and the West."

On 13 June 2016, the opinion of the Venice Commission on Russian undesirable organizations law  was published. According to the Venice Commission conclusion, Russian undesirable organizations law consists the vague definition of certain fundamental concepts, such as “non-governmental organisations”, grounds on the basis of which the activities of a foreign or international NGO may be declared undesirable, “directing of” and “participating in” the activities of a listed NGO, coupled with the wide discretion granted to the Office of the Public Prosecutor and the lack of specific judicial guarantees in the Federal Law, contradicts the principle of legality. The automatic legal consequences (blanket prohibitions) imposed upon NGOs whose activities are declared undesirable (prohibition to organise and conduct mass actions and public events or to distribute information materials) may only be acceptable in extreme cases of NGOs constituting serious threat to the security of the state or to fundamental democratic principles. In other instances, the blanket application of these sanctions might contradict the requirement under the European Convention on Human Rights that the interference with the freedom of association and assembly has to respond to a pressing social need and has to be proportional to the legitimate aim pursued. Furthermore, the inclusion of an NGO in the List should be made on the basis of clear and detailed criteria following a judicial decision or at least, the decision should be subject to an appropriate judicial appeal.

See also
 Russian foreign agent law

References

External links
 Official list of undesirable organizations (in Russian)
 Russian Duma chronology, bill No. 662902-6
 Full text of the law, publication No. 0001201505230001
 The most draconian law yet. Everything you need to know about Russia's new legislation against ‘undesirable organizations’, Meduza, 5 May 2015
 ‘Pure pragmatism—nothing personal’. ‘Meduza’ interviews the author of Russia's new law against ‘undesirable’ organizations, Meduza, 21 May 2015

Law of Russia
Human rights abuses in Russia
2015 in Russia
2015 in law
Censorship in Russia
Russia–United States relations
Regulation of non-governmental organizations
Organizations based in Russia